The Ouseburn Valley is the name of the valley of the Ouseburn, a small tributary of the River Tyne, running southwards through the east of Newcastle upon Tyne, England. The name refers particularly to the urbanised lower valley, spanned by three impressive bridges, which is nowadays a cultural and social oasis close to the centre of Newcastle.

Industrial history 
The lower Ouseburn was the cradle of the industrial revolution in Newcastle. There was a cluster of heavy crafts and industries in the area. Coal was brought from the Town Moor along the Victoria Tunnel, where the tidal nature of the Ouseburn allowed wherries – the local barges – to be loaded at low tide and pulled out to the collier brigs and snows waiting in the Tyne.

Cultural development
The lower Ouseburn Valley had fallen into disuse and dereliction by the mid-twentieth century, but its industrial heritage had left many large buildings which, since the 1970s, have increasingly been utilised as creative workspaces by artists, musicians and performers. From 1996, a development trust (the Ouseburn Trust), in partnership with the local authority, has led the area's regeneration as a cultural hotspot. This has been so successful that Ouseburn is now marketed as a trendy place to live.

The area is now a hub for the arts and creative industries, and is home to the Biscuit Factory (open gallery), the Mushroom Works (open first weekend of the month), Testhouse 5 (appointment only), North Grange Glass (stained glass gallery and cafe), 36 Lime Street and Cobalt Studios. The Valley is also the home of Seven Stories, the national centre for children's books.

The Ouseburn Trust remains a landlord and developer in the Valley, and seeks to involve people in the heritage and regeneration of the area through its programme of free walks, talks and volunteering activities.

Other features 
The valley is home to a number of pubs known locally for live music and real ale, these include:
 The Cluny - one of the most important venues for up-and-coming bands in the region.
 Free Trade Inn - marks the location where river Ouseburn joins the river Tyne and has a menu with locally sourced produce.
 The Tyne Bar - has a unique beer garden sheltered by the arch of the road bridge above.
 The Cumberland Arms - live music, stand up comedy nights and bed & breakfast.
 The Tanners Arms - marks the entrance to the Ouseburn (if you are coming from the city centre).
 Cobalt Studios - popular live music venue.
 Ship Inn - relaxed alehouse with a patio.

There is a large variety of food available to suit most tastes:
 Northern Rye - one of the most outstanding bakeries in Newcastle.
 Dreamworld Cakes - serves brunch, afternoon tea and artisan coffee.
 The Kiln - a cafe offering hand-on pottery experience.
 Cook House - a restaurant that has been on the Good Food Guide every year since 2016.
 Di Meo’s - award-winning small-batch ice cream, fresh pizza, and Italian sweet treats.

Bridges
There are three high-level bridges that cross the valley in close proximity to each other.
These are the Ouseburn railway Viaduct, the Byker Viaduct carrying the Tyne and Wear Metro, and the Byker road bridge.

Hadrian's Wall crossed the Ouseburn just to the south of the Byker road bridge, and is thought to have run through the site of the City Farm. No trace of the wall can now be seen above ground, though an illustrated information board can be seen at the eastern end of a new block of flats on the east side of the river, which were built on the line of the wall.

Miscellaneous 
The Valley has its own community wiki, created by Alex Finnegan, founder of PuppetShip CIC.

References

Districts of Newcastle upon Tyne
Valleys of Tyne and Wear